Oakley is a spring line settlement at the foot of the Chiltern Hills on the route of the Lower Icknield Way. It is in the civil parish of Chinnor, and 20th century housing developments have absorbed Oakley into that village.

External links

Villages in Oxfordshire